The SAN 511, formerly OM 50 Nemesis, is a bolt-action sniper rifle made by Swiss manufacturer Swiss Arms (formerly AMSD). It was created in early 21st century. It fires the .50 BMG cartridge. It is a derivative of the French sniper rifle Hecate II made by the manufacturer PGM.

Users
:Used by Special Forces and State Border Service (DSX)
: Used by Georgian Special Operations Forces.
: Used by law enforcement forces under Ministry of Internal Affairs.

References

External links
Official website AMSD
SAN 511 on official website, Swiss Arms
OM 50 Nemesis at Modern Firearms Encyclopedia

.50 BMG sniper rifles
Bolt-action rifles
Sniper rifles of Switzerland